The Jackson and McMinn Treaty settled land disputes between The United States, the Cherokee Nation, and other tribes following the early re-settlement of the Old Settlers of the Cherokee people to the Arkansaw Territory following the Red Stick War.

Background
Following the War of 1812, and the concurrent Red Stick War, the U.S. government attempted to persuade the Cherokee tribes to a voluntary removal to the Arkansaw Territory.  This effort was headed by the Indian agent, Return J. Meigs.  When the Cherokee arrived in Arkansaw, however, it was discovered that the land promised them was already in possession of other Native American peoples.

Treaty
The outcome of subsequent negotiations resulted in the Jackson and McMinn Treaty of 1817, which transferred lands fronted by the Sequatchie River in Tennessee to the United States in return for secured title to lands along the Arkansas and White Rivers for the Cherokee. In the treaty, the federal government also promised to fund the move of the Indians to the west.

See also
 Jackson Purchase (U.S. historical region)

References

Treaties of indigenous peoples of North America
1817 treaties
United States and Native American treaties
Cherokee treaties